Muzaffarabad Tigers is a franchise cricket team that represents Muzaffarabad, Azad Kashmir in the Kashmir Premier League. They were coached by Mohtashim Rasheed and captained by Mohammad Hafeez. They lost in the final to Rawalakot Hawks.

Squad

Season standings

Points table

League fixtures and results

Playoffs

Qualifier

Final

Statistics

Most runs 

Source: Score360

Most wickets 

Source: Score360

References

External links
Team Records 2021 at ESPNcricinfo

Kashmir Premier League (Pakistan)